The 1934 Washington Senators played 154 games, won 68, lost 86, and finished in seventh place in the American League. They were managed by Joe Cronin and played home games at Griffith Stadium. In the eighth inning of their game against the Boston Red Sox on June 9, the Washington Senators hit 5 consecutive doubles – the most ever hit consecutively during the same inning.

Regular season

Season standings

Record vs. opponents

Notable transactions 
 May 9, 1934: Bob Boken was traded by the Senators to the Chicago White Sox for Red Kress.

Roster

Player stats

Batting

Starters by position 
Note: Pos = Position; G = Games played; AB = At bats; H = Hits; Avg. = Batting average; HR = Home runs; RBI = Runs batted in

Other batters 
Note: G = Games played; AB = At bats; H = Hits; Avg. = Batting average; HR = Home runs; RBI = Runs batted in

Pitching

Starting pitchers 
Note: G = Games pitched; IP = Innings pitched; W = Wins; L = Losses; ERA = Earned run average; SO = Strikeouts

Other pitchers 
Note: G = Games pitched; IP = Innings pitched; W = Wins; L = Losses; ERA = Earned run average; SO = Strikeouts

Relief pitchers 
Note: G = Games pitched; W = Wins; L = Losses; SV = Saves; ERA = Earned run average; SO = Strikeouts

Farm system

Notes

References 
1934 Washington Senators at Baseball-Reference
1934 Washington Senators team page at www.baseball-almanac.com

Minnesota Twins seasons
Washington Senators season
Wash